Below are the squads for the women's football tournament at the 2002 Asian Games, played in Busan, South Korea.

China
Coach: Ma Liangxing

Chinese Taipei
Coach: Chang Ming-hsien

Japan
Coach: Eiji Ueda

North Korea
Coach: Ri Song-gun

South Korea
Coach: Lee Young-ki

Vietnam
Coach:  Jia Guangta

References

2002 Asian Games Report

External links
Official website

2002
Squads